Apraksin or Apraxin is a Russian masculine surname, its feminine counterpart is Apraksina or Apraxina. It may refer to
Fyodor Apraksin (1661–1728), Russian admiral
Marfa Apraksina (1664–1716), second wife of Tsar Feodor III of Russia
Stepan Fyodorovich Apraksin (1702–1758), Russian commander during the Seven Years' War
Stepan Stepanovich Apraksin (1747–1827), Russian commander during the Napoleonic Wars
Tatyana Apraksina, Russian artist and writer

See also
 Apraksin Dvor
Apraksin, Leningrad Oblast, a settlement in Russia

References
 

Russian-language surnames